David Hyde Pierce (born April 3, 1959) is an American actor. He starred as psychiatrist Dr. Niles Crane on the NBC sitcom Frasier from 1993 to 2004, and won four Primetime Emmy Awards and a Screen Actors Guild Award for the role. Pierce also received the 2007 Tony Award for playing Lieutenant Frank Cioffi in the musical Curtains. He is also widely known for playing Frank Prady in eight episodes of the television legal drama The Good Wife, and Henry Newman in the comedy film Wet Hot American Summer and its subsequent television spin-offs.

Pierce has played supporting roles in many films, including Joan Micklin Silver's Crossing Delancey (1988), Terry Gilliam's The Fisher King (1991), Nora Ephron's Sleepless in Seattle (1993), Mike Nichols' Wolf (1994), and Oliver Stone's Nixon (1995). He has also starred in the cult romantic comedy Down with Love (2003), and the dark comedy film The Perfect Host (2010). His voice roles include Disney Pixar's A Bug's Life (1998), Osmosis Jones (2001), and Treasure Planet (2002).

Besides his performance in Curtains, Pierce also had Broadway roles as Sir Robin in Monty Python's Spamalot, Vanya in Vanya and Sonia and Masha and Spike and Horace Vandergelder in the 2017 revival of Hello, Dolly!; the latter two of which Pierce was nominated for a Tony Award. In 2015, he directed the Broadway musical It Shoulda Been You.

Early life 
Pierce was born in Saratoga Springs, New York. His father, George Pierce, was an aspiring actor, and his mother, Laura Marie Pierce (née Hughes), was an insurance agent. He is the youngest of four children: he has two older sisters, Barbara and Nancy and one older brother, Thomas. He adopted the middle name Hyde to avoid confusion with another actor named David Pierce. As a child, Pierce frequently played organ at the local Bethesda Episcopal Church. As a child, Pierce attended the all boys' sleepaway summer camp Kabeyun, where he first began acting in their camp productions of Gilbert & Sullivan and directed their production of H.M.S. Pinafore.
 
After graduating from Saratoga Springs High School in 1977, Pierce attended Yale University. He originally majored in music with an emphasis in piano performance, but later changed to a double major in English literature and theater studies. While attending Yale, Pierce performed in and directed student productions, appearing in the Yale Gilbert & Sullivan Society's production of H.M.S. Pinafore. Pierce also directed the Gilbert & Sullivan Society's operetta Princess Ida. Pierce graduated from Yale in 1981 with a Bachelor of Arts degree.

Career

1980s
After his graduation, Pierce moved to New York City, where during the 1980s and early 1990s he was employed in various jobs, such as selling ties at Bloomingdale's and working as a security guard, while pursuing an acting career and studying at Michael Howard Studios. During this period he played Laertes in a popular off-Broadway production of Hamlet, with Kevin Kline in the title role, and made his Broadway debut in 1982 in Christopher Durang's Beyond Therapy.

1990s–2000s

Pierce's first big television break came in the early 1990s with Norman Lear's political comedy, The Powers That Be, in which Pierce played Theodore, a Congressman. Despite positive reviews from critics, the show was canceled after a brief run.

In part owing to his close facial resemblance to Kelsey Grammer, the producers of the Cheers spin-off Frasier created the role of Niles Crane (Frasier Crane's younger brother) for him. Although prior to Frasier going into production, Pierce had petitioned the Screen Actors Guild to change his billing to David Pierce, the name he had used on the stage, the use of his middle name in the show's credits helped reinforce the actor's and the character's "snooty" image. For his work on Frasier, Pierce was nominated for a Best Supporting Actor Emmy a record eleven consecutive years, winning in 1995, 1998, 1999 and 2004.

Pierce also appeared alongside Jodie Foster in Little Man Tate, with Anthony Hopkins in Oliver Stone's Nixon (1995), and with Ewan McGregor in Down With Love (2003). He provided the voice for Doctor Doppler in Disney's 42nd animated feature, Treasure Planet, Slim, a stick insect in Pixar's A Bug's Life and Abe Sapien in Guillermo del Toro's Hellboy. In his role in Sleepless in Seattle (1993), Pierce played the brother of Meg Ryan's character, a professor at Johns Hopkins University. The movie was released three months before the start of Frasier. In 2001, he starred in the cult 1981-set summer camp comedy Wet Hot American Summer, as the befuddled astrophysicist, Prof. Henry Newman.

In 2005, Pierce joined Tim Curry and others in the stage production of Spamalot. In August and September 2006, he starred as Lieutenant Frank Cioffi in Curtains, a new Kander and Ebb musical staged at the Ahmanson Theatre in Los Angeles. In March 2007, Curtains opened on Broadway and on June 10, 2007, Pierce won the Tony Award for Best Performance by a Leading Actor in a Musical at the 61st Tony Awards for his performance. In his acceptance speech, Pierce said the first words he spoke on a Broadway stage were, "I'm sorry, I'm going to have to ask you to leave."

On November 19, 2007, Pierce was awarded an honorary Doctor of Fine Arts degree from Niagara University in Lewiston, New York.  In 1999 he was awarded an honorary degree from Skidmore College, located in his native Saratoga Springs.

2010s

In 2010, Pierce appeared in a revival of David Hirson's play La Bête directed by Matthew Warchus.  The production debuted on London's West End before moving to New York. Also in 2010, Pierce had his first starring film role as Warwick Wilson in the dark comedy/psychological thriller The Perfect Host.

From 2014 to 2015 Pierce appeared in The Good Wife as Frank Prady on CBS. He also starred as Assoc. Prof. Henry Neumann in Wet Hot American Summer: First Day of Camp (2015) on Netflix. Pierce directed the Broadway production of the musical It Shoulda Been You. In 2015 he directed the Manhattan Theater Club production of David Lindsay-Abaire's play Ripcord Off-Broadway at City Center.

Pierce appeared in the Off-Broadway limited engagement of A Life by Adam Bock. The play premiered at the Peter Jay Sharp Theater on October 24, 2016, directed by Anne Kauffman, and closed on November 27. In 2017 he returned to television in the limited docudrama series about LGBT rights, When We Rise as Dr. Jones. He also appeared as himself with Julie Andrews in Julie's Greenroom on Netflix.

Pierce co-starred with Bette Midler in the Broadway revival of Hello, Dolly!. The musical opened on April 20, 2017, at the Shubert Theatre. The show was a critical and box office hit. Pierce himself received a Tony Award nomination for Best Actor in a Musical for his performance. Pierce received a 2017 Drama League award nomination for Hello, Dolly! and A Life.

2020s 
In 2020, Pierce replaced Tom Hollander as Paul Cushing Child in the limited series Julia which premiered on HBO Max in March 2022. The cast includes Sarah Lancashire, Bebe Neuwirth, and Isabella Rossellini.

Voice acting 
Pierce is known for his distinctive voice and, like his Frasier co-star, Kelsey Grammer, is often called upon to provide voice work. His roles include the narrator of the movie The Mating Habits of the Earthbound Human in 1999, the walking stick insect "Slim" in A Bug's Life, Dr. Delbert Doppler in Disney's film Treasure Planet, and amphibian Abe Sapien in Hellboy. Pierce declined to be credited for his Hellboy role because he felt it was the performance of Doug Jones, and not his own voice, which ultimately brought the character of Abe Sapien to life. He was the voice for "Drix", a cold pill, in the animated comedy Osmosis Jones.

In a deliberate in-joke, he voiced Cecil, the brother of Kelsey Grammer-voiced Sideshow Bob, in The Simpsons episode "Brother from Another Series", in which the two characters parallel the Frasier–Niles relationship. At one point in the episode, Cecil mistakes Bart for Maris, the unseen wife of Niles on Frasier. He returned as Cecil in the Season 19 episode "Funeral for a Fiend" where Frasier co-star John Mahoney voices Dr. Robert Terwilliger Sr., the father of Cecil and Sideshow Bob.

Pierce provided the voice of Mr. Daedalus in the 1998 Disney show Hercules: The Animated Series. In 2006, he co-starred in the animated pilot for The Amazing Screw-On Head as the Screw-On Head's nemesis Emperor Zombie; however, the series was not picked up. His commercial voiceover work included ads for the Tassimo coffee system, Seattle's Metro Transit, and home furnishings retailer Ikea Canada.

Pierce narrated an audio tour guide, Napa Uncorked, in 2002. Pierce was nominated for a Grammy Award for Best Spoken Word Album for Children in 2010 for his narration of The Phantom Tollbooth.

Personal life 

After years of media speculation about his sexuality, Pierce revealed in 2007 that he is gay and later confirmed through his publicist that he and television writer, director and producer Brian Hargrove were a couple. When accepting his Tony Award for Curtains, Pierce thanked "my partner, Brian, because it's 24 years of listening to your damn notes—that's why I'm up here tonight." They married in California on October 24, 2008, just days before Proposition 8 was adopted as law, banning same-sex marriages in the state. On May 28, 2009, while a guest on The View, he publicly announced his marriage to Hargrove and expressed his anger about the approval of Proposition 8.

Pierce has spent years working with the Alzheimer's Association on behalf of Americans with Alzheimer's disease.  He has appeared in Washington, D.C., to testify in support of expanding funding for treatment, and he publicly campaigned for the National Alzheimer's Project Act. Pierce told MSNBC in 2011, "it is up to us, to all of us, to the American people and to their representatives about whether we face the challenges and make all the effort necessary or if we ignore it and just let this sort of tidal wave crash over us."

Filmography

Film

Television

Theatre

Awards and nominations

References

External links 

 
 
  (archive)
 
 Interview with Vulture magazine

1959 births
Living people
20th-century American male actors
21st-century American male actors
American Episcopalians
American male film actors
American male musical theatre actors
American male television actors
American male voice actors
Audiobook narrators
American gay actors
LGBT people from New York (state)
Male actors from New York (state)
Outstanding Performance by a Male Actor in a Comedy Series Screen Actors Guild Award winners
Outstanding Performance by a Supporting Actor in a Comedy Series Primetime Emmy Award winners
People from Saratoga Springs, New York
Tony Award winners
Yale University alumni
American theatre directors
21st-century American LGBT people